The 2006 World Cup was the 18th edition of the FIFA international association football tournament.

2006 World Cup may also refer to:

Sports
 2006 IAAF World Cup, in athletics
 2006 IBF World Championships, in badminton
 2006 Men's Hockey World Cup, in field hockey
 2006 Women's Hockey World Cup, in field hockey
 2006 World Cup of Pool
 2006 Women's Rugby World Cup, in rugby union
 2006 ISSF World Cup Final, in Olympic shooting events
 2006 Speedway World Cup
 2006 Alpine Skiing World Cup
 2006 FIFA Club World Cup, in club association football

Video games
 2006 FIFA World Cup (video game), official video game of the 2006 FIFA World Cup